Dirk Milton Graham (born July 29, 1959) is a Canadian former professional ice hockey forward who played for the Chicago Blackhawks and Minnesota North Stars in the National Hockey League. He was honored in 1991 as the Frank J. Selke Trophy winner for outstanding defensive play by a forward. Graham served as head coach of the Blackhawks during the 1998–99 season before being relieved of his duties after 59 games. Graham was the first NHL captain of African descent.

Playing career
Graham was selected 89th overall by the Vancouver Canucks in the 1979 NHL Entry Draft after spending four years with the Regina Pats in the Western Hockey League. Graham spent four years in the minor leagues which included the International Hockey League and the Central Hockey League. In 1980–81, Graham scored 40 goals with the Toledo Goaldiggers of the IHL, and he was named to the second all-star team. In 1982–83, he scored 70 goals with the Goaldiggers and was named to the first all-star team. This caught the attention of some, and he was signed as a free agent by the Minnesota North Stars after never playing a game with the Canucks. Graham spent two more years developing in the American Hockey League and Central Hockey League. He was selected to the CHL First All-Star Team in 1983–84. In 1985–86, Graham was playing full-time with the North Stars. He recorded consecutive 20 goal seasons in Minnesota and was chosen to represent Team Canada in the 1987 World Ice Hockey Championships. On January 2, 1988, Graham was traded to the Chicago Blackhawks for Curt Fraser.

Graham played his best hockey in Chicago. In his first full season with the Blackhawks (1988-89), Graham topped the 30 goal mark for the first time in his career and finished with a career high 78 points (A stunning 10 of his 33 goals were short-handed; thus he joins Wayne Gretzky, Mario Lemieux, and Marcel Dionne as one of only four players to achieve ten or more short-handed goals in a season). He scored 20 goals or more four times with the Blackhawks. 

In 1990–91, he won the Frank J. Selke Trophy for best defensive forward in the league and represented Team Canada in the Canada Cup tournament. Canada would beat the United States to take first place. Late in 1988–89, Graham was named team captain (replacing Denis Savard), the first player of African descent to become team captain in the National Hockey League. He captained the team all the way to the Stanley Cup Finals in 1991–92, where they were swept by the Pittsburgh Penguins. Graham retired in 1995 after the lockout shortened season.

Post-playing career
Shortly after retiring, Graham served as assistant coach for Craig Hartsburg with the Chicago Blackhawks. Graham took a year off, then returned as a scout for the Chicago Blackhawks. He served briefly as a head coach in 1998–99 until he was replaced by Lorne Molleken. He is currently a scout for the San Jose Sharks.

Awards and achievements

 WHL Second All-Star Team – 1979
 Selected to the IHL Second All-Star Team in 1981.
 Selected to the IHL First All-Star Team in 1983.
 Selected to the CHL First All-Star Team in 1984.
 Frank J. Selke Trophy winner in 1991.
 First player of African descent to be named team captain in the NHL.
 First person of African descent to be named head coach in the NHL.

Career statistics

International

Coaching record

References

External links
 

    
  

1959 births
Living people
Black Canadian ice hockey players
Canadian ice hockey coaches
Canadian ice hockey right wingers
Chicago Blackhawks captains
Chicago Blackhawks coaches
Chicago Blackhawks players
Chicago Blackhawks scouts
Dallas Black Hawks players
Fort Wayne Komets players
Frank Selke Trophy winners
Ice hockey people from Saskatchewan
Minnesota North Stars players
Regina Pats players
Salt Lake Golden Eagles (CHL) players
San Jose Sharks scouts
Sportspeople from Regina, Saskatchewan
Springfield Falcons coaches
Springfield Indians players
Tampa Bay Lightning scouts
Toledo Goaldiggers players
Vancouver Canucks draft picks
Canadian expatriate ice hockey players in the United States